This is the discography of American rapper KRS-One.

Albums

Studio albums

Collaboration albums

Compilations 
 Battle for Rap Supremacy (KRS-One vs. MC Shan) (1996)
 A Retrospective (2000)
 Best of Raptures Delight (2003)
 D.I.G.I.T.A.L. (2004)
 Playlist: The Very Best of KRS-One (2010)

Miscellaneous 
 Strickly for da Breakdancers & Emceez (2001)
 The Mix Tape / Prophets Vs. Profits (2002)
 Footsoldiers mix (2006) (collaboration with Footsoldiers, hosted by Tony Touch
 Back To The L.A.B. (Lyrical Ass Beating) (2010)

Singles

As a lead artist

Collaborative

Appearances 
KRS One has appeared on several songs with other artists, due to this he has received 9 Gold and 7 Platinum plaques. 

1987
 "Going Way Back" and "Moshitup" both by Just-Ice (featuring KRS-One) on the album Kool & Deadly (Justicizms) – KRS & Just-Ice produced the whole album
1988
 "Self-Destruction" (featuring Boogie Down Productions, Stetsasonic, Kool Moe Dee, MC Lyte, Doug E. Fresh, Just-Ice, Heavy D & Public Enemy) by Stop the Violence Movement from "Self-Destruction" 12-Inch Single
 1989
 "Clobberin' Time/Pay The Price" by Sick of It All from Blood, Sweat and No Tears
 1990
 "The TR 808 Is Coming" by D-Nice from Call Me D-Nice
 "Evil That Men Do" by Queen Latifah on All Hail the Queen
 "Serious [Ceereeus BDP Remix]" by Steady B from Serious 12-inch single
 "Party Together" by Sly & Robbie from the album Silent Assassin
 1991
 "Rhymin' Skills" by D-Nice (featuring KRS-One) on the album To tha Rescue
 1991
 "Radio Song" by R.E.M. from Out of Time
 "Rise 'N' Shine" by Kool Moe Dee (featuring KRS-One and Chuck D) from Funke, Funke Wisdom
 "Good Kill" by Too Much Joy from the album Cereal Killers
 "The Jam" by Shabba Ranks from the album As Raw as Ever
 "I Get Wrecked" by Tim Dog on the album Do or Die
 "Heal Yourself" (featuring Big Daddy Kane, Harmony, LL Cool J, Ms. Melodie, Queen Latifah, MC Lyte, Freddie Foxxx, Kid Capri, Run-DMC & Jam Master Jay & KRS-One) by H.E.A.L. Human Education Against Lies on the album H.E.A.L.: Civilization Vs. Technology
 1993
 "Rough..." by Queen Latifah on Black Reign
 1994
 "Big Joe Krash & So Much Greater" from the Break The Chain maxi / KRS-One aka Big Joe Krash |Break The Chain
 "Friends and Respect" by Heavy D and the Boyz from the album Nuttin' but Love
 1995
 Stop The Breaks by Ron G (featuring Raekwon, Killa Sin, & Notorious B.I.G.) from the album Unreleased And Unleashed Bad Boy Entertainment
 "Represent The Real" by Das EFX on Hold It Down (1995)
 "Bronx Tale" by Fat Joe on Jealous One's Envy
 "Station Identification " by Channel Live, KRS produced most of this album except for four   tracks
 "KRS-One Speech" by Funkmaster Flex on The Mix Tape, Vol. 1
 1996
 "The French Connection" from the Ma 6-T va crack-er soundtrack Ma 6-T va crack-er
 "Brainstorm" from the Lord Finesse album The Awakening
 "No Gimmicks" from the Lord Finesse album The Awakening
 "East Coast/West Coast Killas" by Dr. Dre from Dr. Dre Presents the Aftermath
 "Conscious Style" by Poor Righteous Teachers from The New World Order
 "Real Ting", "Ghetto Gold & Platinum Respect" (1996)
 "Crazy" (Feat. KRS-One) from the Young Zee album Musical Meltdown
 "Milk (People Call Me)" (Feat. Busta Rhymes & KRS-One) from the Young Zee album Musical Meltdown
 1997
 "Reputation" by Chubb Rock feat. KRS-One from The Mind
 "Men of Steel" by Shaquille O'Neal feat. Ice Cube, B-Real, Peter Gunz & KRS-One
 "Move Ahead" by Soul Assassins from Chapter 1 (Soul Assassins album)
 "PBS" by "Positive Black Soul" from the album New York / Paris / Dakar
 1998
 "Bulworth (They Talk About It While We Live It)" by Prodigy, KRS-One, Method Man and KAM from Bullworth The Soundtrack
 "Blade" Feat. Channel Live from the album Blade: Music from and Inspired by the Motion Picture. Although on the soundtrack album, the song did not feature in the film "Blade".
 "Unstoppable" by Public Enemy from He Got Game Soundtrack
 "Drop It Heavy" by Show & AG from Full Scale
 "Digital" by Goldie from Saturnz Return
 "I'm Still #1" (Feat. Eminem & KRS-One) from the Cali Kings album Mixtape Volume 1
 1999
 "C.I.A. (Criminals In Action)" by Zack de la Rocha, KRS-One, Last Emperor on Lyricist Lounge, Volume One
 "B-Boy 2000" by Crazy Town on The Gift of Game
 "Live & Direct" by Sugar Ray from 14:59
 "Burning Disaster" by Language Lab
 "Ocean Within" by Saul Williams (unreleased)
 "Line of Fire" by Domingo feat. KRS-One, MC Shan, Godsons, F.T., Bamboo, Feel-X, Sinz of Reality & Ras Kass
 "The Anthem" by Sway & King Tech feat. RZA, Tech N9ne, Eminem, Pharoahe Monch, Xzibit, Kool G Rap, Jayo Felony, Chino XL, KRS-One from the album This or That
 "Where You At" by Rascalz from the album Global Warning
 "Live on the Mic" by Kurupt from the album Tha Streetz Iz a Mutha
 2000
 "DITC feat. Big Pun" by D.I.T.C from D.I.T.C
 "Class of 87" by Tony Touch feat. Big Daddy Kane, Kool G Rap, The Piece Maker
 "Symphony 2000" by Truck Turner feat. Big Pun, KRS-One, Kool G Rap
 "Kenny Parker Show 2001" by Xzibit from Restless
 "Up from da Underground" by Xzibit feat. Ras Kass, KRS-One & Mad Lion from Likwit Rhymes
 2001
 "Return of Hip Hop (Ooh, Ooh) by DJ Tomekk on The Return of Hip Hop
 "Drop it Heavy feat. Big Pun" by Showbiz & A.G. on Drop it Heavy
 "KRS-One Intro" by Sway & King Tech on KRS-One Intro
 "Balumbalang!" by Mexicano 777 from the album God's Assassins
 2002
 "GospelAlphaMegaFunkyBoogieDiscoMusic" by (T-Bone) feat. KRS-One
 2003
 "Take It" by will.i.am feat. KRS-One from Must B 21
 "If U Only Knew" by CunninLynguists feat. KRS-One, Anetra from Sloppy Seconds Vol.1
 "Let's Go (It's a Movement)" by Warren G feat. KRS-One, Lil' Ai from Beef Soundtrack
 "U Must Learn" by Snoop Dogg on Welcome to tha Chuuch Mixtape Vol. 2
 "Bin Laden (Remix)" by Immortal Technique feat.Chuck D
 "Pack Up (Remix)" by Lyrics Born, with Evidence, Jumbo the Garbageman (of Lifesavas), KRS-One
 2004
 "Let's Go" from the Da Beatminerz album Fully Loaded w/ Statik
 "Gangsta House" by Jazzy Jeff from the album In the House
 "Dear Mr. President" by The S.T.O.P Movement (2004)
 2005
 "My Thing!!" by Emmanuel from the album D'Illusions of Grandeur
 "Our Philosophy" by Mr. R, Rockin' Squat, KRS-One
 2006
 "Trash Talk" by Kenny Parker (Mess Hall Recordings)
 "Ground Level" and "Do I Scare You?" by Footsoldiers
 2007
 "Speak the Truth" by X-Clan (produced by Jake One) from Return from Mecca
 "Classic (DJ Premier Nike Remix)" with Kanye West, Nas, and Rakim
 "Make it Happen" with Elemental Emcee and DJ Klever
 "Sex, Drugs & Violence" by Public Enemy from How You Sell Soul to a Soulless People Who Sold Their Soul???
 "The Perfect Beat" by Talib Kweli on Eardrum
 "Exodus" by Noisia & Mayhem on Exodus
 "Did What We Had to Do" by Statik Selektah with Large Professor & L Da Headtoucha
 "Wholetrain" by Wholetrain OST with El Da Sensei
 "Love" by Almost September feat. KRS-One & Sleepy Brown from The Almost September EP
 "Throwin Up Letters (Dirty Version)" by Longevity feat. KRS-One & Rakaa Iriscience
 2008
 "5 Boroughs" by LL Cool J Feat. Method Man, KRS-One, Jim Jones & Lil' Kim on Exit 13
 "The DJ" by DJ Revolution on King Of The Decks
 "My Conscience" by Fat Joe on The Elephant in the Room
 "Arrival (Bassnectar remix)" by Heavyweight Dub Champion
 "Criminal Minded 2008" [w/ DJ Premier] by Smirnoff and his Remix Project
 "Control" by Cymarshall Law & KRS-One on Global Connection Vol. 1
 "Come Back Home" by KRS-One on "WYLA?"
 "How It's Supposed to Be" by Ed O.G. & Da Bulldogs from the album Life of a Kid in the Ghetto – Demos and Rarities (recorded in 1990/91)
 "Rock Dis" by Marley Marl & Craig G on the album Operation: Take Back Hip-Hop
 "16 17 18" by Almost September feat. KRS-One, Al Be Back
 "Come Back Home", by Copperpot
 "Run It" by EPMD on the album We Mean Business
 2009
 "New York" by Peedo feat. KRS-One, Fat Joe
 "We Speak Hip Hop" by Grandmaster Flash feat. KRS-One, Afasi, Kase. O, Maccho, Abass from The Bridge (Concept of a Culture)
 "What If" by Grandmaster Flash from The Bridge (Concept of a Culture)
 "Get It Done" by Joe Flizzow feat. KRS-One from the album President
 "We Are Hip Hop" by The Temple of Hip Hop feat.  Fat Joe, KRS-One, Rampage, Rha Goddess, Smooth
 "Mega Fresh X" by Cormega from the album Born and Raised
 "Pass the Mic" by Masta Ace & Ed O.G. from the album Arts & Entertainment
 "The Movement" by Jay-Roc N' Jakebeatz from the album Power to the B-Boyz
 "Grand Concourse Benches" by Alchemist from the album Chemical Warfare
 "You Gotta Stay Hungry" by 67 Mob from the album T.I.M.E.
 "We Need You" by Beast 1333 feat. KRS-One, Kiyana & Realest Reeken from the album Mark of the Beast
 "Jam On It", "Change" and "All City Kings" all by Beast 1333 feat. KRS-One from the album Mark of the Beast
 "Hip Hop" by N.A.S.A. from The Spirit of Apollo
 "Arrival" by Heavyweight Dub Champion feat. A.P.O.S.T.L.E., KRS-One & Stero-Lion from Rise of the Champion Nation
 "Rise" by Heavyweight Dub Champion feat. A.P.O.S.T.L.E., J Criminology, KRS-One, Lady K & Stero-Lion from Rise of the Champion Nation
 "King of the Mountain" by Heavyweight Dub Champion feat. A.P.O.S.T.L.E., David Icke & KRS-One from Rise of the Champion Nation
 "The World Is Crumbling" by Nicole Holness feat. KRS-One & Mateo Jordache
 "H.E.A.L." by J-Love feat. Freddie Foxxx, KRS-One, Kid Capri, LL Cool J, MC Lyte, Ms. Melodie, Queen Latifah & Run-D.M.C.
 2010
 "A Dream" by Wyze Mindz feat. J.F.K., KRS-One, Les Brown & Rocky from the album World Meltdown
 "The Truth Is... (KRS-One Testimony)" by Truth Now from Karma Alarm
 "5%" by DJ Premier feat. KRS-One & Grand Puba from the album DJ Premier Presents Get Used To Us
 2011
 "History" by Game feat. KRS-One, Big Daddy Kane, Doug E Fresh from the mixtape Purp & Patron
 "What is Hip Hop?" by MC Lars feat. KRS-One, Rittz, mc chris from the mixtape Indie Rocket Science
 "The Gospel of Hip-Hop" by MC Lars feat. KRS-One from the album Lars Attacks!
 "Clobberin' Time" by Sick of it All from the album Nonstop (Note: This is a new recording from the one 22 years ago)
 "À la vie, à la mort" Taktika Feat. Krs One & Buckshot from the album À bout portant confirmed by boutique
 "Rise" by Liquid Stranger & Heavyweight Dub Champion from the album The Arcane Terrain
 "Key of Life" by Rockin' Squat from US Alien Chapter One
 2012
 2013
 "Future" by Brothers of the Stone feat. KRS-One & Beast 1333 from the album Brothers of the Stone
 "Dvign se" by Trkaj from Vse je OK
 "99 Interludes" by Insight on D/A Orthophonic Sounds
 2014
 "No Requests" by Datsik from Down 4 My Ninjas
 "What It Is" by Jonathan Emile of The Morph-tet from the album Exclamations
 2015
 "Jihad Love Squad" by N.A.S.A.
 "Free Flow (Club Dub)" by Robosonic
 "BLK THSS" and "Crowdrockers" from the PE 2.0 album InsPirEd
 "Superpowers" by Mr. Green from Live From The Streets
 2016
 "Buckshot" by Macklemore & Ryan Lewis feat. DJ Premier from the album This Unruly Mess I've Made
 "What It Is" (Remix)" by Jonathan Emile, Paul Cargnello and James Di Salvio of Bran Van 3000 from the album Party Gras
 2017
 "To nie jest hip-hop" by Quebonafide feat. KRS-One from the album "Egzotyka"
 "Let Us Begin" by Snoop Dogg from the album Neva Left

Notes

References 

Hip hop discographies
Discographies of American artists